Fayer is a surname. Notable people with the surname include:

 Elsa Fayer (born 1974), French radio and television presenter
 Jane Fayer (born 1958), Puerto Rican swimmer
 Michael D. Fayer (born 1947), American chemical physicist
 Yuri Fayer (1890–1971), Soviet Jewish conductor

See also
 Fayed